Limburg-Styrum-Bronchhorst was a noble family of the Netherlands which originated in Germany. It was a line of the Limburg-Styrum family and was partitioned from Limburg-Styrum-Bronchhorst-Borkelö in 1766.

Counts of Limburg-Styrum-Bronchhorst (1766 - 1806)

House of Limburg
Counties of the Holy Roman Empire
House of Limburg-Stirum
States and territories disestablished in 1806